IV: Luminescence is the third studio album and fourth overall release by the Canadian hard rock band Boulevard, released on September 22, 2017. The album was recorded at Warehouse Studio in Vancouver B.C and engineered by Eric Mosher, and Zak Blackstone, assisted by Matt Harvey and Ryan Enockson. Additional overdubs were  recorded at Westsonic Music, Vancouver B.C.and engineered by Dave Corman. Tracks were also recorded at Abbey Road Studios in London U.K. and engineered by Chris Bolster, assisted by John Barrett.

Track listing

Personnel
David Forbes - lead vocals
Dave Corman - guitars
Andrew Johns - keyboards, lead vocals, and background vocals
Mark Holden - saxophone
Cory Curtis - bass
Randall Stoll - drums and percussion

References

2017 albums
Boulevard (Canadian band) albums